Zeodera is a genus of ground beetles in the family Carabidae, first described by François-Louis Laporte in 1867. There are about six described species in Zeodera.

More than 15 species were recently transferred from Zeodera to the genus Oxycrepis, subgenus (Loxandrus).

Species
These six species belong to the genus Zeodera:
 Zeodera atra Laporte, 1867  (Australia)
 Zeodera intermedia (Allen, 1982)  (New Guinea)
 Zeodera karawarii (Maindron, 1908)  (Indonesia and New Guinea)
 Zeodera simplex (Darlington, 1962)  (Indonesia and New Guinea)
 Zeodera straneoi (Darlington, 1962)  (Indonesia and New Guinea)
 Zeodera strigitarsis (Straneo, 1939)  (Indonesia and New Guinea)

References

External links

 

Pterostichinae